Phyllodocidae is a family of polychaete worms. Worms in this family live on the seabed and may burrow under the sediment.

Characteristics
Members of the Phyllodocidae are characterised by an eversible pharynx and leaf-like dorsal cirri. The head has a pair of antennae at the front, a pair of ventral palps and a single median antenna known as a "nuchal papilla". There is a pair of nuchal organs and there may or may not be a pair of eyes. The first two or three body segments may be part-fused and bear up to four pairs of tentacular cirri. The remaining body segments each bear leaf-like dorsal and ventral cirri, the dorsal ones being larger. The parapodia are uniramous or biramous, and chaetae are present on all but the first segment.

Genera
The World Register of Marine Species includes the following genera :
Subfamily Eteoninae Bergström, 1914
Genus Eteone Savigny, 1818
Genus Eulalia Savigny, 1822
Genus Eumida Malmgren, 1865
Genus Galapagomystides Blake, 1985
Genus Hesionura Hartmann-Schröder, 1958
Genus Hypereteone Bergström, 1914
Genus Mystides Théel, 1879
Genus Protomystides Czerniavsky, 1882
Genus Pseudomystides Bergström, 1914
Genus Pterocirrus Claparède, 1868
Genus Sige Malmgren, 1865
Subfamily Notophyllinae Pleijel, 1991
Genus Austrophyllum Bergström, 1914
Genus Clavadoce Hartman, 1936
Genus Nereiphylla Blainville, 1828
Genus Notophyllum Örsted, 1843
Subfamily Phyllodocinae Örsted, 1843
Genus Chaetoparia Malmgren, 1867
Genus Levisettius Thompson, 1979 †
Genus Paranaitis Southern, 1914
Genus Phyllodoce Lamarck, 1818

References

Polychaetes
Annelid families